John Chuang may refer to:

John Chuang (American businessman), American entrepreneur and co-founder of Aquent
John Chuang (Singaporean businessman), Singaporean businessman and founder of Petra Foods